"Night and Day" is a 1991 song by Bette Midler written by Roxanne Seeman and Billie Hughes. It is the second single from Some People's Lives produced by Arif Mardin with Marc Shaiman as associate producer. "Night and Day" was arranged by Arif Mardin, Billie Hughes, and Joe Mardin. Jack Joseph Puig was the recording and mix engineer. "Night and Day" was also released as a single in Japan.

"Night and Day" is included in A Gift of Love, the 2015 compilation album by Bette Midler focusing on her ballads. It is one of ten songs on the list of LA Times journalist James Reed in his story "On Bette Midler's birthday, 10 songs that remind us why we fell in love with her", printed December 1, 2016. It was also included on the Bette Midler collection "3 for One" released in Australia.

Overview
Seeman and Hughes recorded a demo of the song performed by Billie Hughes.  Seeman took the song demo to New York and dropped it off with a letter for Tunc Erim, A&R at Atlantic Records. A week later, Tunc Erim invited Seeman to lunch where he told her that Ahmet Ertegun and Doug Morris liked the song and wanted to show it to Mike Rutherford of Mike + The Mechanics. After the lunch, Seeman went to see Vicky Germaise in Arif Mardin's office at the Atlantic Recording Studios. Germaise asked Seeman if she had another copy and overnighted the demo to Arif Mardin who was in Los Angeles, producing Bette Midler's upcoming album.

Chart performance
"Night and Day" was released to adult contemporary radio and stayed on the Billboard AC chart for 15 weeks, peaking at number 15. The release to mainstream radio came later with "Night and Day" entering the Contemporary Hit Radio charts as Most Added and Significant Action.

As "Night and Day" was ascending the Billboard Hot 100, the Gulf War broke out, focusing attention back on the first single, "From A Distance". "Night and Day" remained on the Hot 100 for 7 weeks, peaking at 62.

Critical reception
Walta Borawski of Gay Community News, Boston clarified "'Night and Day' is not the Cole Porter song" calling it "Roxanne Seeman and Billie Hughes' bright little tribute to the old "opposites attract" truism." A reviewer from Billboard praised the song comparing it to the first single as "...an equally appealing pop ballad. Midler's evocative performance works well within the song's haunting delicate keyboard arrangement." Gene Sandbloom from The Network Forty wrote, "'Night And Day' takes Bette back to a jazz vocal style, as she almost converses over the Enya-esque background. By second listen, the chorus takes on renewed strength, making this both a mood piece and Top 40 single at the same time."

Music video
A music video was produced to promote the single, directed by Irish music video and commercial director Meiert Avis.

Charts

Television performances
Oprah Winfrey's "International Men's Show"
VH1's Behind the Music - Bette Midler
One Life to Live
Another World
Santa Barbara
Passions

Other versions
Billie Hughes included a version of "Night and Day" on his Welcome to the Edge album which charted #1 in Japan.
The Japanese hit duo Wink released a Japanese version of "Night and Day".
Jasmine released a Mandarin version of "Night and Day".
Cherrie Choi released a Cantonese version of "Night and Day".

References

External links
 "Night and Day" Billie Hughes video on YouTube

1990 songs
1991 singles
Bette Midler songs
Songs written by Billie Hughes
Songs written by Roxanne Seeman
Song recordings produced by Arif Mardin
Atlantic Records singles
Billie Hughes songs
Wink (duo) songs
Music videos directed by Meiert Avis